Kirill Igorevich Biryukov (born 30 October 1992) is a Russian former football midfielder.

Club career
He made his debut in the Russian Second Division for FC Istra on 22 April 2012 in a game against FC Znamya Truda Orekhovo-Zuyevo.

He made his Russian Football National League debut for FC SKA-Khabarovsk on 17 July 2018 in a game against FC Armavir.

References

External links
 
 
 Career summary by sportbox.ru

1992 births
Sportspeople from Tashkent
Living people
Russian footballers
Association football midfielders
FC Khimki players
FC SKA-Khabarovsk players
FC Veles Moscow players
FC Olimp-Dolgoprudny players